The Quest for Consciousness: A Neurobiological Approach is a 2004 book on consciousness written by Christof Koch.

References

2004 non-fiction books
Books about consciousness